Grupo Joly is a Spanish publishing company which started operating in 1867 in Andalusia, southern Spain, publishing Diario de Cádiz. Grupo Joly sold 100,000 copies a day in 2002 and reached 400,000 readers daily.

Publications
Grupo Joly's publications include eight Spanish dailies:
Diario de Cádiz
Diario de Jerez
Europa Sur
Diario de Sevilla
El Dia de Córdoba
Huelva Información
Granada Hoy
Málaga Hoy

Management
José Joly Martínez de Salazar
Rosario Joly Palomino
José Joly Palomino
Joaquina Martínez de Salazar Bascuñana
Joaquín Joly Martínez de Salazar
Rosa Joly Palomino

Editors
Manuel Clavero Arévalo
José Luis Ballester
Carlos Colón Perales
Manuel Concha Ruiz
Francisco Ferraro
Rafael Padilla

Directives
José Joly Martínez Salazar
Tomás Valiente
Javier Moyano
Juan Carlos Fernandez
Javier Ysasi
Javier Tovar
José Juaquín León
José Antonio Carrizosa
Manuel Jesús Florencio
Angel Navarro
Pablo Joly
Javier Prieto
Ignacio G. Cosgaya
Fernando de Parias
Tomás Díaz

External links
Grupo Joly's Website 
Wikipedia (Spanish) Article 

Mass media companies of Spain
Mass media in Andalusia